Jim Powell is an American documentary film producer. A graduate of Kent State University, Powell is the producer of award-winning documentaries The Arnolds of Owen County and Space Camp. He also received awards for his performance in Missions-in-Motion. In 2006, Powell and his wife produced Children of the Storm, a documentary detailing the experiences of children who survived Hurricane Katrina.

References

External links

Children of the Storm

American documentary filmmakers
Kent State University alumni
Living people
Year of birth missing (living people)
Place of birth missing (living people)